DV8 was an American, alternative rock band formed in Midlothian, Texas, United States, in 2002.  The band consisted of Cash Kelley (vocals, guitar), John Cade (drums), and David Sposito (bass, back-up vocals).  In 2004, the band released its debut EP, A Sip of What is to Come.  That same year, a promotional DVD was produced by one of the bands sponsors, Monster Energy. In 2005, they were invited to perform at the Download Festival in England's Donington Park.  DV8 split up in 2006.

The band was managed by Bowling For Soup frontman Jaret Reddick.

History

Lead singer Cash founded DV8 in 2002 recruiting his friends, John Cade, and David Sposito. They began playing at small venues in the area surrounding their hometown of Midlothian, Texas. Eventually, they went on to play larger stages and venues, including the 2004 Warped Tour, the Freakers Ball, and the Download Festival in the UK.

Over the course of their career, DV8 played shows with many notable acts, including Simple Plan, All American Rejects, Bowling For Soup, Fall Out Boy, Mest, and Matchbook Romance. Receiving high acclaim, Monster Energy and Ernie Ball were among many high-profile companies to sponsor the band.

In June 2004, the band released their debut EP entitled A Sip of What is to Come. The EP was recorded at Yellow Dog Studios by Zac Maloy of The Nixons. Plans were in motion to record a full-length album, however the group disbanded before this could happen.

Cash went on to other projects, including fronting the Texas band Hermosa, and is currently the owner and designer of Custom Chaos Art in Dallas, Texas.

Discography

EPs
A Sip of What is to Come (2004)

Members
 Band members
  Cash Kelley – vocals, guitar
  John Cade – drums
  David Sposito – bass guitar,  vocals

See also

 List of alternative rock artists

References

External links
 DV8 on Broadjam

2002 establishments in Texas
2006 disestablishments in Texas
Alternative rock groups from Texas
American pop rock music groups
Punk rock groups from Texas
Musical groups established in 2002
Musical groups disestablished in 2006